The Secret World of Alex Mack is an American television series that ran on Nickelodeon from October 8, 1994, to January 15, 1998, replacing Clarissa Explains It All on the SNICK line-up. It also aired on YTV in Canada and NHK in Japan, and was a staple in the children's weekday line-up for much of the mid-to-late 1990s on the Australian Broadcasting Corporation. Repeats of the series aired in 2003 on The N, but it was soon replaced there. The series was produced by Thomas Lynch and John Lynch of Lynch Entertainment, produced by RHI Entertainment, Hallmark Entertainment, and Nickelodeon Productions and was co-created by Tom Lynch and Ken Lipman.

Series overview

Episodes

Season 1 (1994–95)

Season 2 (1995–96)

Season 3 (1996–97)

Season 4 (1997–98)

References

External links

Lists of American children's television series episodes
Lists of American comedy-drama television series episodes
Lists of American teen drama television series episodes
Lists of Nickelodeon television series episodes
Lists of American science fiction television series episodes